Mr. Blues is the sixth album led by saxophonist Hank Crawford featuring performances recorded in 1965 and 1966 for the Atlantic label.

Reception

AllMusic awarded the album 3 stars.

Track listing
All compositions by Hank Crawford except as indicated
 "Mr. Blues" - 3:59
 "On a Clear Day (You Can See Forever)" (Burton Lane, Alan Jay Lerner) - 3:09  
 "Hush Puppies" - 3:07
 "Danger Zone" (Percy Mayfield) - 3:27
 "Route 66" (Bobby Troup) - 3:28
 "Lonely Avenue" (Doc Pomus) - 4:10
 "Teardrops" (Sylvester Thompson, Seaphus Scott) - 3:32
 "Smoky City" - 3:39
 "The Turfer" - 3:33

Personnel 
Hank Crawford - alto saxophone, piano
Fielder Floyd, John Hunt - trumpet 
Wendell Harrison - tenor saxophone
Howard Johnson (tracks 4, 6 & 9), Lonnie Shaw (tracks 1-3, 5, 7 & 8) - baritone saxophone
Sonny Forriest - guitar (tracks 1, 2, 4, 6 & 9) 
Charles Dungey (track 4), Charles Green (tracks 1-3, 5, 7 & 8), Charles Lindsay (tracks 6 & 9)  - bass
Joe Dukes (track 4), Wilbert Hogan (tracks 3, 6 & 9), Milt Turner (tracks 5, 7 & 8), Isaac Walton (tracks 1 & 2) - drums
Recorded in NYC on October 17, 1965 (track 8), October 29, 1965 (track 3), November 17, 1965 (tracks 5 & 7), January 14, 1966 (track 6 & 9), January 19, 1966 (track 4) and March 21, 1966 (tracks 1 & 2)

References 

1967 albums
Hank Crawford albums
Atlantic Records albums
Albums produced by Nesuhi Ertegun
Albums produced by Arif Mardin